Frank Richard Stranahan (August 5, 1922 – June 23, 2013) was an American sportsman. He had significant success in both amateur and professional golf. He was ranked number one in his weight class in powerlifting, from 1945 to 1954, and he became known on the golf course and off as the "Toledo strongman" long before the modern game of golf and fitness. After he retired from tournament golf in the early 1960s, he became a prolific long-distance runner, competing in 102 marathons.

Early life and family
Stranahan was born in Toledo, Ohio in 1922. He was born into a very wealthy family; his father, Robert A. Stranahan Sr., was the founder of the highly successful Champion Spark Plug company. Frank's father's millions allowed Frank to concentrate on golf, and while in his teens he set a goal of becoming the best golfer in the world. He grew up playing the famous Inverness Club in Toledo, and won several club championships there.

Coached by Byron Nelson
Stranahan received instruction as a junior at Inverness in the early 1940s from Byron Nelson, the club's professional, who was also playing the PGA Tour at that time. Nelson retired in 1946 after one of the greatest competitive careers in golf history. Stranahan played college golf for the University of Miami. Nelson later mentored several other young players who went on to significant competitive success, including World Golf Hall of Fame members Ken Venturi and Tom Watson, as well as Marty Fleckman (1965 NCAA champion, with one Tour win).

Competitive golf career
During his amateur golf career, spanning from 1936 to 1954, Stranahan won over 70 amateur tournaments, and several Open events as well, competing against professionals. Stranahan was able to remain amateur by forgoing the prize money he could have won as a professional, due to his family wealth. His greatest accomplishments included appearing as a finalist in over a dozen national championships, winning seven. He won two major championships (as they were counted at the time): the 1948 and 1950 British Amateurs. Stranahan was runner-up in five other major championships, including the British Amateur, the Masters Tournament, The Open Championship, and the U.S. Amateur. He won the Canadian Amateur Championship in 1947 and 1948. He won the Tam O'Shanter All-American Amateur six consecutive years from 1948 to 1953; this was a significant extravaganza hosted by impresario George S. May. His globetrotting allowed him to compete in over 200 tournaments across three continents during his amateur career.

He remained an amateur most of his career, during which time he played on three winning Walker Cup teams in 1947, 1949, and 1951. He finally turned pro at age 32 in September 1954, after losing to 24-year-old Arnold Palmer in the round of 16 at the U.S. Amateur the previous week. He is the only amateur golfer in PGA history to win a professional event as an amateur more than once. Stranahan's dream was to win this championship; his closest was a 1950 finals loss in extra holes to Sam Urzetta. Stranahan stated at the time of turning pro that one of his reasons for making the switch was a desire for the Tour players to develop greater respect for him, since if he won a Tour event as an amateur, the runner-up received the first-place money. As a pro, his greatest victory was the 1958 Los Angeles Open.

Style, mentors Gary Player
Stranahan worked with several golf instructors in an attempt to find the perfect swing; he was characterized by his fellow competitors as someone who experimented too much with his game, with a 'made' swing as opposed to a 'natural' swing, although his short game was very well respected. Stranahan became good friends with the young Gary Player, then, in the mid-1950s, just beginning to make his mark on the professional circuit, with advice on fitness, which Player successfully incorporated into his own training and preparation which Player had been training on since a boy. Stranahan drew chuckles from many by traveling to golf tournaments with his weightlifting equipment, but was in fact pioneering an eventual method which would become the norm several decades later, with the Tour supplying staffed workout facilities to players at Tour events by the 1980s.

Stranahan was known as something of a playboy during his amateur years, before settling down with his marriage in 1954. He was seen as arrogant by many fellow competitors, who often struggled to make ends meet, well before the evolution of golf into its modern big-money era.

Run-ins with Masters administrators
Several times during his amateur career, Stranahan ran afoul of Clifford Roberts, the chairman of Augusta National Golf Club and the Masters Tournament, because of his unsportsmanlike conduct, which violated club and tournament rules. Notably, Stranahan was warned, and then finally suspended from the tournament in 1948, for playing more than one ball during practice rounds, although he had finished as runner-up the previous year. Stranahan appealed unsuccessfully to Bobby Jones, as well as fellow competitors, to be reinstated. Stranahan was invited to compete again the following year, despite the controversy, which continued, due to his failure to respect the rules. After Stranahan's father was approached by Jones over the matter, the younger Stranahan eventually wrote letters of apology to Jones, and behaved properly thereafter at the tournament, while maintaining there was much more to this situation which remained behind the scenes, without ever specifying the details of this. Stranahan retired from competitive golf in the early 1960s.

Business studies
After leaving competitive golf, he concentrated on business. He studied at Harvard University and the Wharton Business School at the University of Pennsylvania.

Legacy
Stranahan's greatest personal feat is that he helped save the Open Championship. After World War II when few American golfers competed in the event, Stranahan competed in eight consecutive Open Championships, and was runner-up in 1947 and 1953. His personal support, along with the 1961 and 1962 wins of Arnold Palmer, revived, sustained, and returned the greatness of the Open Championship through encouraging other top Americans to compete, despite the low prize funds of that era.

Family misfortune, final years
Stranahan suffered significant family misfortune. His wife Ann, whom he married in 1954, was herself a top-class amateur golfer; she finished runner-up in the 1960 Canadian Women's Amateur. Ann died at age 45 from cancer. His eldest son Frank Jr. died from cancer at age 11. His second son Jimmy died of a drug overdose in Houston, Texas at age 19. Stranahan's father also died from cancer. His youngest son Lance works in real estate in Florida.

Stranahan died June 23, 2013, aged 90, at his home in Miami Beach, Florida, where he had lived for many years.

Amateur wins
this list is incomplete
1940 Toledo District Junior Championship
1941 Trans-Mississippi Amateur, Ohio Amateur
1942 Ohio Amateur
1946 Mexican Amateur, Western Amateur, North and South Amateur, Great Lakes Amateur
1947 Canadian Amateur, Great Lakes Amateur
1948 British Amateur, Canadian Amateur, Mexican Amateur, All-American Amateur
1949 Western Amateur, North and South Amateur, All-American Amateur
1950 British Amateur, All-American Amateur
1951 Mexican Amateur, Western Amateur, All-American Amateur
1952 Western Amateur, North and South Amateur, All-American Amateur
1953 All-American Amateur

Professional wins

PGA Tour wins (6)
1945 Durham Open (as an amateur)
1946 Kansas City Invitational Victory Bond Golf Tournament, Fort Worth Invitational (both as an amateur)
1948 Miami Open (as an amateur)
1955 Eastern Open
1958 Los Angeles Open

Other wins
this list is incomplete
1948 Ohio Open (as an amateur)
1960 Ohio Open
1961 Ohio Open

Major championships

Amateur wins (2)

Results timeline
Amateur

Professional

Note: Stranahan never played in the PGA Championship.

LA = low amateur
NT = no tournament
CUT = missed the half-way cut
DNQ = did not qualify for match play portion
R256, R128, R64, R32, R16, QF, SF = Round in which player lost in match play
"T" indicates a tie for a place

Sources: Masters, U.S. Open and U.S. Amateur, The Open Championship, The Amateur Championship: 1946, 1947, 1949, 1951, 1953, 1954.

Summary

Most consecutive cuts made – 8 (twice)
Longest streak of top-10s – 1 (five times)

U.S. national team appearances
Amateur
Walker Cup: 1947 (winners), 1949 (winners), 1951 (winners)
Americas Cup: 1952 (winners)

See also
List of golfers with most PGA Tour wins

References

External links

American male golfers
Miami Hurricanes men's golfers
PGA Tour golfers
Golfers from Ohio
Harvard University alumni
Wharton School of the University of Pennsylvania alumni
Sportspeople from Toledo, Ohio
Sportspeople from West Palm Beach, Florida
1922 births
2013 deaths